The 2013 ICC World Twenty20 Qualifier was played in November 2013 in the United Arab Emirates and is a part of the ICC World Twenty20 Qualifier series. This edition of the qualifier for the 2014 ICC World Twenty20 was an expanded version comprising ten qualifiers from regional Twenty20 tournaments in addition to the top six finishers of the previous edition. The groups were announced by the ICC on 7 August 2013.

Ireland met Afghanistan in the final for the third time with Ireland winning their 2nd title against Afghanistan and 3rd title overall. The top 6 nations (previously 2) qualified for the 2014 ICC World Twenty20: Ireland, Afghanistan, Netherlands and making their World Twenty20 debut the UAE, Nepal and Hong Kong.

Format
The tournament runs for 16 days with 72 fixtures amongst 16 teams, divided into two groups of eight. Each group plays a round-robin tournament. The bottom three teams of each group are immediately eliminated from contention for the top six positions but will play matches to determine which teams finish in positions 11 to 16. The top three teams from each group compete in the first place playoffs to determine the teams finishing in the top four positions. The other two teams are relegated to the fifth place playoffs where they compete with the fourth- and fifth-ranked teams from each group for the positions of five to ten. Both the first and fifth place playoffs are played in a six-team, single-elimination format. The bottom four teams play in the quarter-finals. The winners of the quarter-finals compete with the top two teams in the semi-finals. Playoffs follow to determine the finishing positions of the teams. The top six teams qualify for the 2014 ICC World Twenty20. They will join the hosts Bangladesh and Zimbabwe in the preliminary group stage, from which only two teams will advance.

Qualification

Regional qualification

Squads
The following squads were named ahead of the tournament:

Match officials
Officiating the tournament was three regional match referees and 17 umpires, one of which was of the Elite Panel and three was on the ICC Assiciate and Affiliate Panel of Umpires.

Umpires
 Steve Davis
 John Ward
 Sharfuddoula
 Michael Gough
 Chettithody Shamshuddin
 S. Ravi
 Mark Hawthorne
 Buddhi Pradhan
 Chris Gaffaney
 Derek Walker
 Shozab Raza
 Ian Ramage
 Sarika Prasad
 Adrian Holdstock
 Ranmore Martinesz
 Gregory Brathwaite
 Joel Wilson

Match referees
 David Jukes
 Dev Govindjee
 Graeme Labrooy

Warm-up matches

Fixtures and results

Group A

Points table

Results

Group B

Points table

Results

Consolation playoffs

Results

5th place playoffs

Bracket

Results

Quarter-finals

Semi-finals

Final

1st place playoffs

Bracket

† Teams qualified for the 2014 ICC World Twenty20 upon reaching this stage.

Results

Quarter-finals

Semi-finals

Final

Final standings

 Qualified for the 2014 ICC World Twenty20 and 2015 ICC World Twenty20 Qualifier.

See also
 2014 ICC World Twenty20

References

External links
 Official website
 Cricketeurope Site
 Tournament website on ESPN Cricinfo

International cricket competitions in 2013
ICC World Twenty20 Qualifier
ICC World Twenty20 Qualifier
2014 ICC World Twenty20
ICC Men's T20 World Cup Qualifier